Angeliki Kanellopoulou (born 18 December 1965) is a Greek former tennis player who competed on the WTA Tour. She reached a career-high ranking of No. 43 in April 1987. During her career, she twice reached the third round of the French Open. She competed in the Federation Cup multiple times and participated in the tennis demonstration in the 1984 Summer Olympics, reaching the quarterfinals. Another career highlight was reaching the finals of the 1986 Athens Trophy, where she lost to Sylvia Hanika.

Kanellopoulou is the mother of pro tennis player Maria Sakkari.

WTA career finals

Singles: 1 (0–1)

ITF Finals

Singles (2–0)

Doubles (0–1)

External links
  
 
 

1965 births
Greek female tennis players
Sportspeople from Athens
Living people
Mediterranean Games gold medalists for Greece
Mediterranean Games silver medalists for Greece
Mediterranean Games medalists in tennis
Competitors at the 1987 Mediterranean Games